Steven Tronet (born 14 October 1986 in Calais) is a French road cyclist, who most recently rode for French amateur team UVC Calais. Tronet previously competed as a professional from 2007 until 2018.

Major results
Source: 

2005
 7th Grand Prix de la ville de Pérenchies
2006
 1st Grand Prix Assevent
 1st Gommegnies Grand Prix
2007
 9th Tour de Vendée
 10th Overall Four Days of Dunkirk
2008
 1st Stage 1 Ronde de l'Oise
 8th Tour du Doubs
 8th Boucles de l'Aulne
2009
 6th Tro-Bro Léon
 7th Cholet-Pays de Loire
 7th Grand Prix d'Isbergues
 8th Polynormande
2010
 1st  Overall Ronde de l'Oise
 8th Le Samyn
 8th Boucles de l'Aulne
2011
 1st Tour du Canton de Saint-Ciers
 3rd Overall Boucles de la Mayenne
 3rd Route Adélie de Vitré
 6th Boucles de l'Aulne
 7th Overall Étoile de Bessèges
2012
 2nd Overall Circuit de Lorraine
1st Stage 5
 2nd Paris–Connerré
 4th Paris–Troyes
 6th Route Adélie de Vitré
 7th Overall Tour du Limousin
2013
 3rd Grand Prix de la Ville de Lillers
 3rd Tour de Vendée
 5th Overall Paris–Arras Tour
 5th Overall Ronde de l'Oise
2014
 1st Grand Prix de la Ville de Lillers
 1st Paris–Troyes
 1st Stage 3 (TTT) Tour d'Auvergne
 9th Overall Four Days of Dunkirk
2015
 1st  Road race, National Road Championships
 1st Stage 2 Circuit des Ardennes
 1st Stage 1 Route du Sud
 2nd Boucles de l'Aulne
 3rd Overall Ronde de l'Oise
1st Stage 2
 6th Route Adélie de Vitré
2016
 10th Grote Prijs Stad Zottegem
2017
 9th Ronde van Limburg

References

External links

1986 births
Living people
French male cyclists
Sportspeople from Calais
Cyclists from Hauts-de-France